Century Motorsport is a professional motor racing team based in Fenny Compton, Warwickshire, in the United Kingdom. They currently participate in the Ginetta GT4 Supercup, the British GT Championship, the Ginetta GT5 Challenge Championship, G50 Cup and the Creventic 24 Hour Series.

The team was founded in 1995.

The team currently runs the following drivers:

References

British auto racing teams
British GT Championship teams
Porsche Carrera Cup Great Britain teams
Auto racing teams established in 1995
1995 establishments in England